Chris Porter is a British record producer, audio engineer and narrator. He has worked with Sir Elton John, Take That, George Michael and Chris de Burgh.

References

External links
Official site

Year of birth missing (living people)
Living people
British record producers
British audio engineers